The CEV Champions League was the highest level of European club volleyball in the 2012–13 season and the 54th edition. It ran from 22 October 2012 until 11 March 2013.

Fenerbahçe were the winner of the previous year.

VakıfBank İstanbul won the title second time with a perfect 12–0 record by defeating Rabita Baku 3–0 in the final.

Teams
The number of participants on the basis of ranking list for European Cup Competitions:

League round
24 teams were drawn to 6 pools of 4 teams each.
The 1st and 2nd ranked qualified for the Playoff 12
The organizer of the Final Four were determined after the end of the League Round and qualified directly for the Final Four.
The team of the organizer of  the Final Four was replaced by the best 3rd ranked team with the best score.
The remaining 3rd placed and all 4th placed teams were eliminated.

Pool A

|}

|}

Pool B

|}

|}

Pool C

|}

|}

Pool D

|}

|}

Pool E

|}

|}

Pool F

|}

|}

Playoffs 12

All times are local time.
In case of a tie – 1 match won & 1 match lost and not depending on the final score of both matches – the teams play a Golden Set to determine which one qualified for the Playoffs 6.

|}
1 Unendo Yamamay Busto Arsizio won the golden set 15–10

First leg

|}

Second leg

|}

Playoffs 6
All times are local time.
In case of a tie – 1 match won & 1 match lost and not depending on the final score of both matches – the teams play a Golden Set to determine which one qualified for the Final Round.

|}

1 Unendo Yamamay Busto Arsizio won the golden set 15–11

First leg

|}

Second leg

|}

Final four
Organizer:  Galatasaray Daikin Istanbul
Venue: TVF Burhan Felek Sport Hall  Istanbul, Turkey

Bracket

Semifinals

|}

Third place

|}

Final

|}

Final standing

Awards

References

External links 

Champions League

CEV Women's Champions League
Women's CEV Champions League
Women's CEV Champions League